Alpine is an unincorporated rural community and census-designated place in Benton County, Oregon, United States. It is west of Monroe off Oregon Route 99W. As of the 2010 Census, the population was 171.

History 
Alpine was so named because it is on the top of one of the foothills of the Central Oregon Coast Range. It is noted that the "situation is not particularly alpine in character". Alpine School operated for several years before there was a settlement in the location, thus the community took its name from the school. In 1908, the Corvallis and Alsea River Railway Company began construction of a line that ended in the settlement of Alpine when funding ran out. The community has burned three times since its heyday in the early 1900s. A post office was established in 1912 and operated until 1976. Alpine now has a Monroe mailing address. Alpine Elementary School closed in 2003. When the Alpine Market closed in 2004, the Alpine Tavern (built in 1936) started selling groceries. In 2005, a vintage photograph of the tavern was featured in a Miller Beer advertisement, and the market was due to be razed.

As of November 2019, the Alpine Tavern was still  a thriving business in the community, preserving area history.

Museums and other points of interest 
Alpine is on the Benton County Scenic Loop, a scenic driving route.

To the west of Alpine is the Woodhall Vineyard, a research vineyard operated by Oregon State University.

References

External links 
1961 photo of Alpine from Salem Public Library
Photographs from Alpine Tavern: Photographs of a Social Gathering Place, James Cloutier's 1977 book
South Benton Community Center

Unincorporated communities in Benton County, Oregon
Census-designated places in Oregon
1912 establishments in Oregon
Unincorporated communities in Oregon